Contacto Vecinal TV is a Venezuelan community television channel. It was created in February 2005 and can be seen in the community of Suata in the José Féliz Ribas Municipality of the Aragua State of Venezuela on UHF channel 59. Tallulat Henriquez is the legal representative of the foundation that owns this channel.

Contacto Vecinal TV does not have a website.

See also
List of Venezuelan television channels

Television networks in Venezuela
Television stations in Venezuela
Television channels and stations established in 2005
2005 establishments in Venezuela
Television in Venezuela
Spanish-language television stations